Richard Blackmore (born 18 October 1953), is a former English footballer who played in the NASL. He recorded a total of 407 appearances for Irish side Dundalk.

Career statistics

Club

Notes

References

1953 births
Living people
English footballers
Association football goalkeepers
Walsall F.C. players
Bristol City F.C. players
New York Cosmos players
Birmingham City F.C. players
Dundalk F.C. players
Denver Dynamos players
Galway United F.C. players
North American Soccer League (1968–1984) players
English expatriate footballers
Expatriate association footballers in the Republic of Ireland
English expatriate sportspeople in Ireland
Expatriate soccer players in the United States
English expatriate sportspeople in the United States